Marie Frances Van Schaack (June 3, 1918 – January 29, 1999), known professionally as Lili St. Cyr, was a prominent American burlesque dancer and stripper.

Early years 
St. Cyr was born Willis Marie Van Schaack in Minneapolis, Minnesota, on June 3, 1918. Her maternal half-sister Rosemary Minsky (married to Harold Minsky née Van Schaack; born 1924) was also a burlesque dancer and stripper under the stage name Dardy Orlando, appearing on The Ellen DeGeneres Show in 2004. The sisters, and Barbara Moffett, were raised by their grandparents, the Klarquists.

Having taken ballet lessons throughout her youth, she began to dance professionally as a chorus line member at the Florentine Gardens in Hollywood. St. Cyr had to beg her manager at a club to let her do a solo act. From her self-choreographed act, she eventually landed a bit part at a club called the Music Box in San Francisco, with the Duncan Sisters. It was here that she found a dancer's salary was only a small fraction of the featured star's salary: the difference was that the featured star was nude.

Burlesque career 
In the 1940s and most of the 1950s, St. Cyr, Gypsy Rose Lee and Ann Corio were the most recognized acts in striptease. St. Cyr's stage name is a patronymic of the French aristocracy, which she first used when booked as a nude performer in Las Vegas.

St. Cyr's reputation in the burlesque and stripping world was that of a quality and high-class performer, unlike others such as Rosa La Rose, who flashed her pubic hair. Two years after she started her career as a chorus line dancer, her stripping debut was at the Music Box, in an Ivan Fehnova production. The producer had not even seen her perform—her striking looks won him over. The act was a disaster, but instead of firing her, Fehnova put together a new act. At the end of the dance, a stagehand pulled a fishing line attached to St. Cyr's G-string, which flew into the balcony as the lights went dim. This act was known as The Flying G, and such creative shows became St. Cyr's trademark.

Over the ensuing years and in a variety of different venues, many of St. Cyr's acts were memorable, with names like "The Wolf Woman", "Afternoon of a Faun", "The Ballet Dancer", "In a Persian Harem", "The Chinese Virgin", as well as "Suicide" (where she tried to woo a straying lover by revealing her body), and "Jungle Goddess" (in which she appeared to make love to a parrot). Props were integral to many of the women's acts. Lili was known not only for her bathtub, but elaborate sets of vanities, mirrors, and hat racks. She variously performed as Cinderella, a matador, Salome, a bride, a suicide, Cleopatra and Dorina Grey.

Montreal
St. Cyr's work from 1944 to 1951 at Montreal's Gayety Theatre led author and filmmaker William Weintraub to later describe her as "Montreal's most famous woman, the city's femme fatale...". Quebec's Catholic clergy condemned her act, declaring that whenever she dances "the theater is made to stink with the foul odor of sexual frenzy." The clergy's outcry was echoed by the Public Morality Committee. St. Cyr was arrested and charged with behavior that was "immoral, obscene and indecent." She was acquitted but the public authorities eventually closed down the Gayety Theatre.

In 1982, St. Cyr wrote a French autobiography, Ma Vie de Stripteaseuse. (Éditions Quebecor). In the book, she declared her appreciation for the Gayety Theatre and her love for the city of Montreal.

Hollywood: nightclubs, films and photographs
While performing in 1947 at Ciro's nightclub in Hollywood (billed as the "Anatomic Bomb"), St. Cyr was arrested by police and taken to court by a customer who considered her act lewd and lascivious. Represented by the infamous Hollywood attorney Jerry Giesler in court, St. Cyr insisted to the jury that her act was refined and elegant. As St. Cyr pointed out, what she did was slip off her dress, try on a hat, slip off her brassiere (there was another underneath), slip into a négligée. Then, undressing discreetly behind her maid, she stepped into a bubble bath, splashed around, and emerged, more or less dressed. After her appearance as a witness, as a newspaper account of the time put it, "The defense rested, as did everyone else." After just 80 minutes of deliberation by the jury, St. Cyr was acquitted.

While St. Cyr starred in several movies, an acting career never really materialized. In 1953, with the help of Howard Hughes, St. Cyr landed her first acting job in a major motion picture in the Son of Sinbad. The film, described by one critic as "a voyeur's delight", has St. Cyr as a principal member of a Baghdad harem populated with dozens of nubile starlets. The film was condemned by the Catholic Legion of Decency. St. Cyr also had a role in the movie version of Norman Mailer's The Naked and the Dead in 1958. In this film, St. Cyr plays 'Jersey Lili', a stripper in a Honolulu night-club and girlfriend of a soldier who boasts to his pals that he has her picture painted inside his groundsheet. Heavy edits of St. Cyr's night-club routine by censors result in some choppy editing in an otherwise finely crafted film. St. Cyr's movie career was short lived, and typically she settled for playing a secondary role as a stripper, or playing herself. Her dancing is featured prominently in two Irving Klaw films, Varietease and Teaserama.

St. Cyr was also known for her pin-up photography, especially for photos taken by Bruno Bernard, known professionally as "Bernard of Hollywood", a premier glamor photographer of Hollywood's Golden Era. Bernard said that she was his favorite model and referred to her as his muse.

Retirement 
St. Cyr depleted the wealth she accumulated during her heyday. While interviewing her for his 1957 program, Mike Wallace stated she earned over $100,000 annually. Many women like her were not supported by their husbands or family. St. Cyr retired from the stage in the 1970s, and began a lingerie business that she retained an interest in until her death. Similar to Frederick's of Hollywood, the "Undie World of Lili St. Cyr" designs offered costuming for strippers, and excitement for ordinary women. Her catalogs featured photos or drawings of her modeling each article, lavishly detailed descriptions, and hand-selected fabrics. Her marketing for "Scantie-Panties" advertised them as "perfect for street wear, stage or photography." Her later years were "quiet—just her and some cats in a modest Hollywood apartment."

Personal life
Although more obscure toward the end of her life, her name came up regularly in 1950s tabloids: stories of her many husbands, brawls over her, and her attempted suicides. St. Cyr was married six times. Her best-known husbands were the motorcycle speedway rider Cordy Milne, musical-comedy actor and former ballet dancer Paul Valentine, restaurateur Armando Orsini, and actor Ted Jordan.

Death 
St. Cyr died in Los Angeles, California, on January 29, 1999, aged 80. She never had children, but told Mike Wallace in an October 5, 1957, interview that had she wanted them she would have adopted.

Legacy and cultural references 
Following her death and a renewed interest in burlesque, especially in Bettie Page, legions of new fans rediscovered some of the dancers in Irving Klaw's photos and movies. In 2001, A&E produced a special on burlesque that included a segment on St. Cyr.

St. Cyr is referenced in two songs that were both stage and movie musicals. In the song "Zip" from the 1940 musical Pal Joey by Richard Rodgers and Lorenz Hart, the singer (reporter/would-be stripper Melba Snyder) rhetorically asks at the climax of the song "Who the hell is Lili St. Cyr?" [i.e., what has she got that I don't have?]. In the 1975 musical The Rocky Horror Picture Show, the final line of the song "Don't Dream It, Be It" (sung by the character Janet Weiss, as played by Susan Sarandon) is "God bless Lili St. Cyr!"

In 1981, actress Cassandra Peterson became famous for her character Elvira, who achieved her trademark cleavage wearing a Lili St. Cyr deep plunge bra.

In 1989, one of St. Cyr's husbands, Ted Jordan, wrote a biography of Marilyn Monroe entitled Norma Jean: My Secret Life with Marilyn Monroe (New York, William Morrow and Company, 1989), in which Jordan claimed that St. Cyr and Monroe had an affair. The claim is both widely disparaged by Monroe's biographers and widely upheld by St. Cyr's. Liza Dawson, editor for William Morrow, publisher of the Jordan book, makes a related claim in an interview with Newsday in 1989. Dawson stated that "Marilyn very much patterned herself on Lili St. Cyr—her way of dressing, of talking, her whole persona. Norma Jean was a mousy, brown-haired girl with a high squeaky voice, and it was from Lili St. Cyr that she learned how to become a sex goddess."

Filmography 
 Love Moods (1952)
 Bedroom Fantasy (1953)
 Striporama (1953)
 Varietease (1954)
 Teaserama (1955)
 Son of Sinbad (1955)
 Buxom Beautease (1956)
 The Naked and the Dead (1958)
 I, Mobster (1958)
 Runaway Girl (1962)

References

External links 
 
 
 Lili St. Cyr interviewed by Mike Wallace on The Mike Wallace Interview, October 5, 1957
 Lili St. Cyr - transcript of the Wallace interview

1918 births
1999 deaths
American female erotic dancers
American erotic dancers
American female models
American vedettes
American burlesque performers
People from Minneapolis
People from Los Angeles
20th-century American dancers
20th-century American women